Alchemilla jaroschenkoi, the holotrichous lady's mantle, is a species of lady's mantle that is endemic to Azerbaijan, where it is only known from near Kiçik Cheurly. It is found in alpine meadows and pastures.

References

jaroschenkoi
Endemic flora of Azerbaijan
Near threatened flora of Asia